This is a list of Roman temples dedicated to the deified emperor Hadrian. Such a temple was called a Hadrianeum.

Caesarea Maritima
A temple was constructed in Caesarea in connection with a visit by Hadrian. It may have continued to function as a pagan temple into the 6th century.
Cyzicus
The temple was begun after an earthquake in 123, when Hadrian arrived to oversee rebuilding. It was finished in 139. According to John Malalas, there was a marble bust of Hadrian on the roof.
Ephesus
The temple was built after Hadrian's death by Publius Vedius Antoninus. It contained a triumphal gate in imitation of the Arch of Hadrian in Athens.
Rome
The great Temple of Hadrian in Rome was built by his successor, Antoninus Pius, in 145.
Seleucia
A temple here has been dated to the reign of Antoninus Pius. The remains of an emperor's statue have been tentatively identified as Hadrian.
Tiberias
Construction of a temple in Tiberias was begun but perhaps not completed. It was until recently known only from the late 4th-century testimony of Epiphanius of Salamis, who received it from Joseph of Tiberias, who claimed to have built a church on the never completed Hadrianeum, which itself had been converted into a public bath. The remains of this temple were discovered in 2004. It was probably constructed in 119/120 in connection with a local issue of coinage by Hadrian.

References

Hadrian
Roman temples of the Imperial cult
Lists of ancient Roman buildings and structures